Guitar Player is an American popular magazine for guitarists, founded in 1967 in San Jose, California. It contains articles, interviews, reviews and lessons covering artists, genres and products. It has been in print since late 1967. The magazine is currently edited by Christopher Scapelliti.

Contents
A typical issue of Guitar Player includes in-depth artist features, extensive lessons, gear and music reviews, letters to the magazine, and various front-of-book articles.

Guitar Player TV
In May 2006, the Music Player Network partnered with TrueFire TV to launch an internet-based television station for guitarists. It provides content similar to that of the magazine such as interviews and lessons. Guitar Player TV is provided at no cost to the user because of advertising and sponsorship.

Guitar competitions
Guitar Player has a yearly competition now called "Guitar Superstar", which used to be the "Guitar Hero Competition".

References

External links
 Guitar Player Online
 Joe Gore discusses his tenure as an editor at Guitar Player (PDF)
 Past and present Guitar Player Staff Interviews
 Guitar Player Online Archives

Monthly magazines published in the United States
Music magazines published in the United States
Guitar magazines
Magazines established in 1967
Magazines published in California